This list of Russian IT developers includes the hardware engineers, computer scientists and programmers from the Russian Empire, the Soviet Union and the Russian Federation.

See also :Category:Russian computer scientists and :Category:Russian computer programmers.

Alphabetical list


A

Georgy Adelson-Velsky, inventor of AVL tree algorithm, developer of Kaissa (the first World Computer Chess Champion)
Andrey Andreev, creator of Badoo, one of the world's largest dating sites, and the 10th largest social network in the world
Vladimir Arlazarov, DBS Ines, developer of Kaissa (the first World Computer Chess Champion)

B

Boris Babayan, developer of the Elbrus-series supercomputers, founder of Moscow Center of SPARC Technologies (MCST)
Alexander Brudno, described the alpha-beta (α-β) search algorithm
Nikolay Brusentsov, inventor of ternary computer (Setun)

C

Andrei Chernov, one of the founders of the Russian Internet and the creator of the KOI8-R character encoding
Alexey Chervonenkis, developed the Vapnik–Chervonenkis theory, also known as the "fundamental theory of learning", a key part of the computational learning theory

D

Mikhail Donskoy, a leading developer of Kaissa, the first computer chess champion
Pavel Durov, founded the VKontakte.ru social network, #35 on Alexa's Top 500 Most Visited Global Websites, the 6th largest social network in the world, and Telegram

E

Andrey Ershov, developed Rapira programming language, started the predecessor to the Russian National Corpus

G

Vadim Gerasimov, one of the original co-developers of the famous video game Tetris
Victor Glushkov, a founder of cybernetics, inventor of the first personal computer, MIR

K

Yevgeny Kaspersky, developer of Kaspersky anti-virus products
Anatoly Karatsuba, developed the Karatsuba algorithm (the first fast multiplication algorithm)
Leonid Khachiyan, developed the Ellipsoid algorithm for linear programming
Tigran Khudaverdyan, deputy CEO of Yandex
Lev Korolyov, co-developed the first Soviet computers
Semen Korsakov, the first to use punched cards for information storage and search
Alexander Kronrod, developer of Gauss–Kronrod quadrature formula and Kaissa, the first world computer chess champion
Dmitry Kryukov, creator of the first Russian search engine, Rambler

L

Evgeny Landis, inventor of AVL tree algorithm
Sergey Lebedev, developer of the first Soviet and European electronic computers, MESM and BESM
Vladimir Levenshtein, developed the Levenshtein automaton, Levenshtein coding and Levenshtein distance
Leonid Levin, IT scientist, developed the Cook-Levin theorem (the foundation for computational complexity)
Oleg Lupanov, coined the term "Shannon effect"; developed the (k, s)-Lupanov representation of Boolean functions

M

Yuri Matiyasevich, solved Hilbert's tenth problem
Alexander Mikhailov, coined the term "informatics"
Anatoly Morozov, worked on automated control systems, problem-focused complexes, modelling, and situational management

N

Anton Nossik, godfather of the Russian internet who began Russian online news

P

Alexey Pajitnov, inventor of Tetris
Victor Pan, worked in the area of polynomial computations
Igor Pavlov, creator of the file archiver 7-Zip; creator of the 7z archive format
Svyatoslav Pestov, developer of jEdit text editor and Factor programming language
Vladimir Pokhilko, specialized in human-computer interaction
Yuriy Polyakov, developed an approximate method for nonlinear differential and integrodifferential equations

R

Bashir Rameyev, developer of Strela computer, the first mainframe computer manufactured serially in the Soviet Union
Alexander Razborov, won the Nevanlinna Prize for introducing the "approximation method" in proving Boolean circuit lower bounds of some essential algorithmic problems, and the Gödel Prize for the paper "Natural Proofs"
Eugene Roshal, developer of the FAR file manager, RAR file format, WinRAR file archiver

S

Ilya Segalovich, founder and one of the first programmers of Yandex, Russian search engine
Anatoly Shalyto, initiator of the Foundation for Open Project Documentation; developed Automata-based programming
Dmitry Sklyarov,  computer programmer known for his 2001 arrest by American law enforcement;  US v. ElcomSoft Sklyarov
Alexander Stepanov, created and implemented the C++ Standard Template Library
Igor Sysoev, creator of nginx, the popular high performance web server, and founder of NGINX, Inc.

T

Andrey Terekhov (Терехов, Андрей Николаевич), developer of Algol 68 LGU; telecommunication systems
Andrey Ternovskiy, creator of Chatroulette
Valentin Turchin, inventor of Refal programming language, introduced metasystem transition and supercompilation

V

Vladimir Vapnik, developed the theory of the support vector machine; demonstrated its performance on a number of problems of interest to the machine learning community, including handwriting recognition

Y

Sergey Yablonsky, founder of the Soviet school of mathematical cybernetics and discrete mathematics

See also

 List of computer scientists
 List of pioneers in computer science
 List of programmers
 Information technology
 List of Russian inventors

 
 
It Developers
Lists of computer scientists
It Developers